Samuel Turyagyenda is a Ugandan police officer, professional pilot and army officer. He served as the commander of the Air Force in the Uganda People's Defence Force (UPDF). He was appointed to that position in May 2013 having been Deputy Commander of the Uganda Air Force, immediately prior to his appointment. He retired in July 2019.

Background and training
Samuel Turyagyenda was born in Rukungiri District in 1952. From 1973 until 1976, he studied in the former Soviet Union, graduating with a Diploma in Commercial Civil Aviation, while a member of the Uganda Police Force. In 1986, he studied in Libya, taking a Conversion Course on MI-8/MI-17 helicopters. He also attended the Air Command and Staff Course at Maxwell Air Force Base, in Montgomery, Alabama, United States. Later, he undertook a refresher helicopter course in Kazan, Russia. He also attended  a course on Commercial Rotorcraft in the United States of America, in 1997. Later he attended a Conversion/Transition Course at Bell Helicopter Training College in Hurst, Texas, United States.

Military career

Samuel Turyagyenda worked as a policeman, in the Uganda Police Force, from 1973 until 1985. In 1986, he transitioned into the National Resistance Army (NRA), without incident. In the Uganda military, he has served as the Squadron Commander of the MI-17 Helicopters, in the Uganda People's Defence Forces. He then became Acting Director of the Uganda Air Force. He was the Deputy Commander of Air Force at the rank of brigadier, immediately prior to his promotion to major general and appointment to his current position as Commander of the UPDF Air Force and Chief Pilot of the Presidential Helicopter.

Personal life
He is married with six children. He is of the Christian faith.

See also
 UPDF
 Wilson Mbadi
 Katumba Wamala
 David Muhoozi
 Muhoozi Kainerugaba
 Yoweri Museveni

References

External links
  Air Forces Africa Commander visits Ugandan Air Force

Living people
Ugandan military personnel
1952 births
Ugandan aviators
People from Rukungiri District
People from Western Region, Uganda
Ugandan generals